Joseph Janney Steinmetz (October 7, 1905 – September 6, 1985) was an American commercial photographer whose images appeared in publications including the Saturday Evening Post, Life, Look, Time, Holiday, Collier's, and Town & Country. He documented scenes of American life including the wealthy and middle-class Americans, including Floridians.

Biography and career
In the Sarasota area his photographic subjects included Emmett Kelly, Elden Rowland, Eric Hodgins, and the Hilton Leech House and Amagansett Art School. Other photographs include pictures of artist Ben Stahl, Ringling Circus choreographer George Balanchine, filming on the set of On an Island with You on Anna Maria Island, president of Coca-Cola Robert Winship Woodruff, Naval Photography School (NAS) in Pensacola, baseball legend Ted Williams, novelist MacKinlay Kantor, the set of Wind Across the Everglades, Karl Wallenda, Emmett Kelly, Lou Jacobs, Billy Bowlegs III, Arthur M. Young flying his model helicopter, and Ringling Circus clowns.

Steinmetz was born in Philadelphia. He became interested in photography when he received his first camera as a gift from his parents on Christmas in 1912.  His first professional camera was a Leica model B. Steinmetz moved from Philadelphia to Sarasota in 1941. He married Lois Foley. Lois Duncan was their daughter. Steinmetz died in Sarasota one month before his 80th birthday.

Gallery

References

External links
  Steinmetz Public Domain photo collection at Florida Memory

People from Philadelphia
People from Sarasota, Florida
Photographers from Florida
20th-century American photographers
Commercial photographers
1905 births
1985 deaths